The Dogger Bank earthquake of 1931 was the strongest earthquake recorded in the United Kingdom since measurements began. It had a magnitude of 6.1 on the Richter magnitude scale, and it caused a shaking intensity of VI (Strong) to VII (Very strong) on the Mercalli intensity scale. The location of the earthquake in the North Sea meant that damage was significantly less than it would have been had the epicentre been on the British mainland.

Earthquake 
The effects were felt throughout Great Britain as well as in Belgium and France. The earthquake resulted in damage at locations throughout eastern England. The coastal town of Filey in Yorkshire was worst hit, with the spire of a church being twisted by the tremor. Chimneys collapsed in Hull, Beverley and Bridlington, and Flamborough Head suffered crumbling of parts of its cliffs. It was also reported that a Hull woman died as a result of a heart attack caused by the quake. In London the head of the waxwork of Dr Crippen at Madame Tussauds fell off.

Tsunami 
A small nondestructive tsunami wave was reported to have hit the east coast of England and other countries around the North Sea.

See also
 List of earthquakes in 1931
 List of earthquakes in the British Isles

References

Further reading

External links
Contemporary newspaper report (archived at the Wayback Machine)
Dogger Bank Earthquake, British Geological Survey
Earthquake records

1931 Dogger Bank
Dogger Bank
Dogger Bank
1931 Dogger Bank
1931 disasters in the United Kingdom
Dogger Bank
June 1931 events